William Biggers (16 October 1874 – 11 July 1935), known during his playing career as William "Billy" Biggar, was an English professional footballer who made over 210 appearances as a goalkeeper in the Southern League for Watford. In all competitions for the Hornets, he made 283 appearances and scored two penalties. Earlier in his career he appeared in the Football League for Sheffield United. During his long playing career, he also acted as trainer at Rochdale and coached at Earlestown.

Career statistics

References

1874 births
English footballers
Brentford F.C. players
English Football League players
Southern Football League players
People from Mexborough
Footballers from Doncaster
Association football goalkeepers
Mexborough F.C. players
Midland Football League players
1934 deaths
Birtley F.C. players
Thurnscoe Victoria F.C. players
Sheffield United F.C. players
West Ham United F.C. players
Fulham F.C. players
Watford F.C. players
Rochdale A.F.C. players
Rochdale A.F.C. non-playing staff
Leyland Motors F.C. players
Earlestown F.C. players